Nikolai Alexandrovich Kozyrev (2 September 1908 – 27 February 1983) was a Soviet Russian astronomer and astrophysicist.

Biography
He was born in St. Petersburg, and by 1928 he had graduated from the Leningrad State University. In 1931 he began working at the Pulkovo Observatory, located to the south of Leningrad. He was considered to be one of the most promising astrophysicists in Russia. Kozyrev was a victim of the Stalinist purges of the Pulkovo Observatory. Started by the accusations of a disgruntled graduate student, most of the observatory staff died as a result. Kozyrev was arrested in November 1936 and sentenced to 10 years for counterrevolutionary activity. In January 1941, he was given another 10-year sentence for "hostile propaganda". While incarcerated, he was allowed to work in engineering-type jobs. Due to the lobbying by his colleagues, he won an early release from detention in December 1946.  As a result of his imprisonment he was mentioned in The Gulag Archipelago by Alexandr Solzhenitsyn.

During his imprisonment, Kozyrev attempted to continue working on purely theoretical physics. He considered the problem of the energy source of stars and formulated a theory. But in his isolation, he was unaware of the discovery of nuclear energy. After his release, Kozyrev refused to believe the theory that stars are powered by nuclear fusion.

Publications
He is most noted for his observation of the transient lunar phenomenon in the crater Alphonsus on the Moon. In 1958 he observed a patch of white within the crater, and a spectrum of the area appeared to reveal an emission cloud of carbon particles. Transient lunar phenomenon had long recorded what appeared to be temporary emissions on the lunar surface, and Kozyrev's observation was the first observation of the kind, and appeared to provide confirmation that the Moon was volcanically active.

In 1953, Kozyrev attempted to analyze the phenomenon of ashen light, a nocturnal air glow on Venus whose existence remains controversial to this day.   He also made the earliest photometric measurements of the visible and ultraviolet spectrum of Venus.  His calculation of the thermal balance of Venus disputed the popular theory that the clouds of Venus consisted of dust.  Kozyrev argued that energy absorbed in the upper atmosphere created high altitude storms, but the surface of Venus would be still and dimly lit. This work influenced the theory of Venus and Nobel Laureate Harold Urey devoted a paper to the analysis and implications of it.

Kozyrev wrongly believed that the white poles of Mars were caused by cloud formations in the atmosphere, not ice on the surface.

Due to his experiments and publications (Causal Mechanics/Theory of Time) he became a controversial figure in Russian scientific community. In the 1930s, Kozyrev was considered the most promising new astrophysicist in Russia, but his arrest and long imprisonment destroyed his career during what is usually the most creative period of a scientist's life. Isolated from all news and publications, he pondered the source of internal heat in stars and planets, but was unaware of the discoveries being made in quantum mechanics and nuclear energy. After his release, he struggled to recover his place in science, but his own theories were out of step with the current physics by that time.

The dispute over Kozyrev's causal-mechanics theory spilled into Pravda in 1959, with criticism by some of the Soviet Union's leading physicists, including Igor Tamm. In January 1960, the Soviet Academy of Sciences and Bureau of Physico-Mathematical Sciences appointed a commission to resolve the dispute. The nine men were assigned to investigate the theory, experimental evidence, and the special issue of planetary asymmetry which Kozyrev claimed was evidence of a gyro-gravitational "latitude effect". Their findings were:

 The theory is not based on accepted clearly formulated axiomatics, its conclusions are not developed by sufficiently strict logical or mathematical methods.
 The quality and accuracy of conducted laboratory experiments do not allow drawing of specific conclusions about the nature of the effect.
 Checking the asymmetric form of major planets by measuring their photographs, it was not found in Saturn. For Jupiter they arrived at the conclusion that the apparent asymmetry was the result of the asymmetric arrangement of bands on its disks but was not a geometrical asymmetry of the planet. [see: Selected Works]

Honors
In September 1969, the International Academy of Astronautics (IAA, Paris, France) awarded N. Kozyrev a nominal gold medal "For remarkable telescopic and spectral observations of luminescent phenomena on the Moon,  showing that the Moon remains a still active body, and stimulating development of the methods of luminescent researches world wide."

In December 1969, the State Committee for Affairs of Discovery and Inventions at the Ministerial Council of the
USSR, awarded N. Kozyrev a diploma "For the discovery of tectonic activity of the Moon."

The following astronomical features are named for him:
 Asteroid 2536 Kozyrev.
 Kozyrev (crater) on the Moon.

Publications

 N.A. Kozyrev, On the Nightglow of Venus, Izvestiya Krymskoi Astrofizicheskoi Observatorii, Vol 12
 N.A. Kozyrev, Molecular Absorption in the Violet Part of the Spectrum of Venus Krymskoi Astrofizicheskoi Observatorii, Vol 12
 N.A. Kozyrev, Selected Works, published by Leningrad State Univ., 1991. 488 p.
 N.A. Kozyrev, V.V. Nasonov, On some properties of time, discovered by astronomical observations, in Problemy issledovaniya vselennoi, 1980, (Russian lang.)
 N.A. Kozyrev, Possibility of experimental study of properties of time, Pulkovo, September 1967 (text available)

Kozyrev mirror

A Kozyrev mirror is a device made from aluminum (sometimes from glass, or reflecting mirror-like material) spiral shape surfaces, which, introduced by  allegedly based on  Kozyrev's theories, are able to focus different types of radiation alike to magnifying glasses, including the types of radiation coming from biological objects. Kozyrev mirrors were used in experiments related to extrasensory perception (ESP), conducted in the Institute of Experimental Medicine of Siberia, division of the Russian Academy of Sciences. Humans, allocated into the cylindric spirals  (usually 1.5 rotations clockwise, made of polished aluminum) allegedly experienced anomalous psycho-physical sensations, which had been recorded in the minutes of the research experiments.

Publications with reference to Kozyrev's work

 Margerison T., Causal Mechanics - The Russian Scientific Dispute, New Scientists, London, Nov 26, 1959
 Akimov, A.E., Shipov, G. I., Torsion fields and their experimental manifestations, 1996 (HTML available)
 Mishin, Alexander M., The Ether Model as Result of the New Empirical Conception, International Academy of MegaSciences, St. Petersburg, Russia (html available)
 Levich, A.P., A Substantial Interpretation of N.A. Kozyrev’s Conception of Time. Singapore, New Jersey, London, Hong Kong: World Scientific, 1996, pp. 1-42.
 A.E. Akimov, G.U. Kovalchuk, V.G. Medvedev, V.K. Oleinik, A.F. Pugach, The preliminary results of astronomical observations of the sky with N.A. Kozyrev's method, Chief astronomical observatory of Ukraine Acad.of Sciences, Kiev, 1992
 Ostrander, S., Schroeder, L., Psychic Discoveries Behind the Iron Curtain, Prentice-Hall, Inc., Englewood Cliffs, N.J., 1970.
 Hellmann, A., Aspekte der Zeit- und Äthertheorie, 2006,
 Lavrentiev, M.M., Yeganova, I.A., Lutset, M.K., Fominykh, S.F. (1990). On distant influence of stars on resistor. Doklady Physical Sciences. 314 (2). 368–370.
 Lavrentiev, M.M., Gusev, V.A., Yeganova, I.A., Lutset, M.K., Fominykh, S.F. (1990). On the registration of true Sun position. Doklady Physical Sciences. 315 (2), 368–370.
 Lavrentiev, M.M., Yeganova, I.A., Lutset, M.K., Fominykh, S.F. (1991) On the registration of substance respond to external irreversible process. Doklady Physical Sciences. 317 (3), 635–639.
 Lavrentiev, M.M., Yeganova, I.A., Medvedev, V.G., Oleynik, V.K., Fominykh, S.F. (1992). On the scanning of star sky by Kozyrev’s detecting unit. Doklady Physical Sciences. 323 (4), 649–652.
 Levich, A.P. (1995). Generating Flows and a Substantional Model of Space-Time. Gravitation and Cosmology. 1 (3), 237–242.
 Wilcock, David. (2011). The Source Field Investigations,

See also
 Time in physics
 K-Space (band)

References

External links
 Nikolai Aleksandrovich Kozyrev: Selected Works online copy of the book (in Russian)
 Kozyrev Observations of Lunar Crater Alphonsus, 1959
 Possibility of Experimental Study of Properties of Time Seminal paper in txt format
 A Substantial Interpretation of  N. A.Kozyrev's Conception of Time
 V. Kaznacheev - Kozyrev Mirrors
 RU2122446 - Kozyrev Mirror Patent - Device for Correction of Man's Psychosomatic Diseases
 Kozyrev’s Mirrors and Electromagnetic Null Zones: Reflections of Russian Cosmic Science. Interview with Alexander V. Trofimov, MD By Carol Hiltner

1908 births
1983 deaths
Psychophysics
Saint Petersburg State University alumni
Soviet astronomers
Soviet astrophysicists
Academic staff of Herzen University